Liechtenstein passports are issued to nationals of Liechtenstein for the purpose of international travel. Beside serving as proof of Liechtenstein citizenship, they facilitate the process of securing assistance from Liechtenstein consular officials abroad (or missions of Switzerland in case a Liechtenstein representation is not available).

The passport, along with the Liechtenstein identity card allows for the freedom of movement in any of the states of EFTA and the EEA. This is because Liechtenstein is a member state of EFTA, and by virtue of it also being a member of the European Economic Area (EEA) and part of the Schengen Area.

Physical appearance
Liechtenstein passports are blue with the coat of arms of Liechtenstein emblazoned in the centre. The words "FÜRSTENTUM LIECHTENSTEIN" (Principality of Liechtenstein) are inscribed above the coat of arms, with "REISEPASS" (passport) and the international biometric passport symbol below.

Effect of Liechtenstein citizenship
Citizens of Liechtenstein are allowed to reside in Switzerland. Additionally, as a member of the European Economic Area (EEA), citizens of Liechtenstein are permitted to take up residence in any EEA member state.

Citizens of EEA member states, which consist of the European Union and three of the four European Free Trade Association states (Iceland, Liechtenstein, and Norway) enjoy the freedom to travel and work in any EEA country without a visa, although transitory dispositions may restrict the rights of citizens of new member states to work in other countries.

Visa requirements

As of March 2020, Liechtenstein citizens had visa-free or visa on arrival access to 179 countries and territories, ranking the Liechtenstein passport 12th in terms of travel freedom overall, and the lowest of the EFTA member states, according to the Henley Passport Index.

In 2017, The Liechtenstein nationality is ranked fourteenth in Nationality Index (QNI). This index differs from the Visa Restrictions Index, which focuses on external factors including travel freedom. The QNI considers, in addition, to travel freedom on internal factors such as peace & stability, economic strength, and human development as well. 

As a member state of the European Free Trade Association (EFTA), Liechtenstein citizens enjoy freedom of movement to live and work in other EFTA countries in accordance with the EFTA convention. Moreover, by virtue of Liechtenstein's membership of the European Economic Area (EEA), Liechtenstein citizens also enjoy freedom of movement within all EEA member states. The Citizens’ Rights Directive defines the right of free movement for citizens of the EEA, and all EFTA and EU citizens are not only visa-exempt but are legally entitled to enter and reside in each other's countries.

See also
Visa requirements for Liechtenstein citizens
Liechtenstein identity card
European Free Trade Association
Passports of the EFTA member states

References

Sources
Immigration and Passport Office
 Council Regulation (EC) No 539/2001 of 15 March 2001 listing the third countries whose nationals must be in possession of visas when crossing the external borders and those whose nationals are exempt from that requirement. For the most up-to-date state see the last consolidated version.

Liechtenstein
Passports
Liechtenstein–Switzerland relations
European Economic Area
European Free Trade Association